Peaceville Records is a British independent heavy metal record label. The label was founded by Paul "Hammy" Halmshaw (of the bands Instigators and Civilised Society) in Dewsbury, England in 1987, who was also a one-time drummer of Sore Throat. Originally a tape label releasing anarcho punk, the releases moved towards metal through crust punk and similar forms of metal-influenced English hardcore punk. Halmshaw started running the label full-time in 1988, although the original tape label incarnation was founded in 1981 as a vehicle for releasing Instigators demo cassettes.

The label is therefore known for the connection between doom metal and the 1980s English crust punk scene. Sister labels 'Deaf' and 'Dreamtime' concentrated more on thrash metal (Deaf) and psychedelic electronica (Dreamtime).

However, the bands My Dying Bride, Darkthrone, Katatonia, Autopsy, Anathema, Paradise Lost, and Opeth - known as the 'Peaceville Stable' - have been the label's most recognizable acts since the 1990s. Peaceville also became known for its anti-major label stance and left wing political outlook.

In November 2006, after 25 years at the helm, Halmshaw announced that he and co-manager Lisa Halmshaw would be leaving the label to concentrate on new projects, and that his former assistant, Paul Groundwell, would be taking over general management duties, following the sale of the label to back catalogue specialists Snapper Music, who had distributed Peaceville since 2001.

Bands
 Aura Noir 
 Autopsy
 Barren Earth
 Bloodbath
 Darkthrone
 Gallhammer
 Hellripper
 Madder Mortem
 Mayhem
 Mork
 Morta Skuld
 Mortuary Drape
 Novembre
 Orange Goblin
 The Provenance
 Ruim
 Sigh (band)
 Sikth
 Static Abyss
 Valkyrja
 Violation Wound

Former bands
 Abscess
 Acrimony
 Agathocles
 Akercocke
 Anathema
 Asgaroth
 At the Gates
 Axegrinder
 Baphomet
 Banished
 Behemoth
 Blackstar
 The Blood Divine
 Candlemass
 Carpathian Forest
 Chumbawamba
 Cradle of Filth
 Deviated Instinct
 Dominion
 Doom
 Electro Hippies
 G.G.F.H.
 Isengard
 Impaler
 Katatonia
 Kong
 My Dying Bride
 Napalm Death
 Opeth
 Paradise Lost
 Pentagram
 Pitchshifter
 Sonic Violence
 Taake
 Toranaga
 Therion
 Thine
 Vital Remains
 Wartech

Compilations
 A Vile Peace (1987)
 Vile Vibes (1990)
 Peaceville Volume 4 (1992)
 The Best of Peaceville (1995)
 Autumn Sampler '95 (1995)
 Under the Sign of the Sacred Star (1996)
 Peaceville X (1998)
 Peaceville Classic Cuts (2001)
 Peaceville Sampler 2002 (2002)
 New Dark Classics (2006)
 Metal Hammer (2006)
 New Dark Classics (2007)
 New Dark Classics II (2007)
 New Dark Classics Vol. 4 (2010)
 21 Years Of Doom, Death & Darkness (2008)
 Katatonia Presents... Peaceville Dark Classics (2011)
 30 Years of Decadence (2017)
 Dark Side of the Sacred Star (2022)

See also
 List of record labels

References

External links
 
 Academy Music Studio, recording venue for many Peaceville artists
 
 Interview for Metalfan.RO with Paul Groundwell

1987 establishments in the United Kingdom
Record labels established in 1987
British independent record labels
Heavy metal record labels
Black metal record labels